La Granja de la Costera is a municipality in the comarca of Costera in the Valencian Community, Spain.

References

Granja de la Costera, La
Granja de la Costera, La